Cheshmeh Qandab (also Romanized as Cheshmeh Qandāb; also known as Chashmeh Gandāb and Cheshmeh Gandāb) is a village in Jolgeh Rural District, in the Central District of Asadabad County, Hamadan Province, Iran. At the 2006 census, its population was 305, in 69 families.

References 

Populated places in Asadabad County